Ximena Hermoso (born April 28, 1991) is a retired tennis player from Mexico.

On 23 April 2012, she reached her highest singles ranking of 331. Her best WTA doubles ranking was world No. 329, achieved 20 May 2013.

Playing for the Mexico Fed Cup team, Hermoso has a win–loss record of 15–7.

ITF Circuit finals

Singles: 7 (3–4)

Doubles: 14 (5–9)

References

External links
 
 
 

1991 births
Living people
Mexican female tennis players
Sportspeople from Puebla
Tennis players at the 2011 Pan American Games
Pan American Games competitors for Mexico
20th-century Mexican women
21st-century Mexican women